Anthony Patrick Hadley  (born 2 June 1960) is an English pop singer. He rose to fame in the 1980s as the lead singer of the new wave band Spandau Ballet and launched a solo career following the group's split in 1990. Hadley returned to the band in 2009 but left again in 2017. Hadley is known for his "expressive voice" and "vocal range".

Early life
Anthony Patrick Hadley was born the first of three children at the Royal Free Hospital in Islington, North London. He has a sister, Lee, and a brother, Steve. His father, Patrick Hadley, worked as an electrical engineer for the Daily Mail, and his mother, Josephine, worked for the local health authority.

Spandau Ballet

Hadley co-founded Spandau Ballet in 1976 as The Cut, with Gary Kemp, Steve Norman, John Keeble and Michael Ellison, all of whom were students at Dame Alice Owen's Grammar School. As a member of Spandau Ballet, Hadley went on to enjoy international success in the 1980s, including hits such as "True", "Gold" and "Through the Barricades", as well as appearing at Live Aid in 1985.

As the lead singer of Spandau Ballet, Hadley became known for his suave image, as well as his powerful voice, which has been described by AllMusic as a "dramatic warble". In his book on the New Romantics, music journalist and author Dave Rimmer described his voice as "like a foghorn—if a foghorn could be imagined trying to emulate both [Frank] Sinatra and [David] Bowie". His Spandau Ballet bandmate Steve Norman described him as having "a massive vocal range". According to Tim Rice, Hadley had a "strong and expressive voice that few of his contemporaries came near to matching".

Spandau Ballet disbanded in 1990 after their final studio album, Heart Like a Sky, failed to live up to the critical and commercial success of their earlier albums, such as True and Parade, and was not released in the United States.

In April 1999, Hadley, along with fellow band members Steve Norman and John Keeble, failed in their attempt to sue Gary Kemp, the band's songwriter, for a share of his royalties. On 25 March 2009, it was confirmed that the band had reformed with Hadley and were embarking on a tour of the UK and Ireland in October 2009. Hadley remained a member of the band intermittently until 2017, when he announced his permanent departure. He later said in 2020: "I'd rather be happy on my own than be in that band again."
In 1991, the Spandau Ballet song "True" was sampled by the American hip hop act P.M. Dawn for their song "Set Adrift on Memory Bliss". It achieved immediate commercial success, hitting number one the week of 30 November 1991 on the Billboard Hot 100 chart, while also reaching No. 3 in the United Kingdom. Hadley also made a cameo appearance in the music video for the song.

Solo

1992–1996: The State of Play and When Saturday Comes
After Spandau Ballet disbanded, Hadley pursued a solo career, signing to EMI and recording his first album, The State of Play, in 1992. The album spawned three singles, but neither it nor any of the singles achieved any kind of chart success, and after one final single, Absolution, released in the summer of 1993, Hadley was subsequently dropped. After leaving EMI, Hadley formed his own record company, SlipStream Records, and his first release was the single "Build Me Up", from the soundtrack of the film When Saturday Comes.

In 1996, Hadley performed in a BBC Radio 2 live performance of Jesus Christ Superstar, playing the title role opposite Roger Daltrey's Judas. In December 1996, Hadley embarked on an orchestral tour of Europe, along with Joe Cocker, Paul Michiels, Dani Klein and Guo Yue.

1997–2000: Tony Hadley and collaborations 
On his return from that tour, Hadley collaborated with Tin Tin Out on their hit "Dance With Me", which reached #35 on the UK Singles Chart, and was the first in a series of electronic, dance and house collaborations over the course of the next three years. In May 1997, Hadley signed a joint deal with PolyGram TV, and released his next eponymous solo album, which included covers and songs that were chosen to match his voice. The album also featured some of his own self-penned songs, such as "She", which he wrote for daughter Toni. The album spawned three singles, but neither the album nor the singles achieved any chart success, and Hadley was once again dropped.

In 1999, Alan Parsons chose Hadley as the lead singer for the track "Out of the Blue" on his album The Time Machine. This led to collaborations with the likes of Eddie Lock, Marc et Claude, Regi Penxten (Milk Inc.) and the Disco Bros, and saw Hadley pursue an altogether different style of music: Euro-House.

2000–2002: Unreleased House Album 
Following a number of successful collaborations with other house artists and DJs, Hadley became the subject of some newfound respect in the 2000s, rooted in an "ironic" appreciation for Spandau Ballet. This saw him begin work on album of solo euro-house material, which remains unreleased, after signing a deal with European label Frontera Recordings. Two singles from the project were released to markets in continental Europe, with Will U Take Me being released in November 2000 and Sweet Surrender in March 2002, neither of which sparked enough interest for the album to be released.

Back on home soil, fearing that the project was too far removed from his origins with Spandau Ballet, Hadley released an EP of four new songs, Get So Lonely, on his own label, Blueprint Recordings, in the summer of 2001. Meanwhile, Debut and Obsession, two live albums featuring recordings taken from a performance in Cologne in 1992 and Ronnie Scott's in 1999 respectively, were released in limited numbers by small-budget labels. The summer of 2002 saw Hadley reunite with former band members John Keeble and Steve Norman for a tour entitled An Evening of Gold, under the moniker Hadley, Norman and Keeble.

2003–2005: Reborn in the USA and True Ballads 
Although a collaboration with Marc et Claude followed in April 2002, no further singles from the house album were released; and by the autumn of 2002, Hadley had signed up to partake in the new ITV reality series Reborn in the USA. Competing against the likes of Peter Cox, Hadley beat ten other artists to win the prize of a recording contract with Universal Music. The resulting album was True Ballads, a compilation of three re-recorded hits from the Spandau Ballet days, ten tracks from his 1997 self-titled album and two new songs: "I Can't Make You Love Me", which he performed on the show, and "After All This Time", the theme song from the BBC drama series Down to Earth, which ran from 2000 until 2005.

Following his success on the show, Hadley continued with a busy performing schedule, and co-headlined a tour with Cox, performing songs from both the 
Go West and Spandau Ballet back catalogues, as well as number of covers. The tour spawned a live album and DVD, both of which were released in 2004. The following year, Hadley co-headlined another tour, this time with Martin Fry of ABC, in very much the same vein; performing both ABC and Spandau Ballet songs. A live album and DVD of this tour was released in 2005.

2006–2008: Passing Strangers 
2006 saw the release of Hadley's first solo album in nine years, a jazz-swing album entitled Passing Strangers. The album consisted of eighteen tracks, both covers and original songs, and was laid out in the format of a vinyl album, described by Hadley as being a "nod" to the good old days. In support of the album, Hadley headlined a "By Request" tour from March to May 2006, llowed by a big band tour later in the year.

Hadley performed a set with several other 1980s acts at the Retro Fest on 1 September 2007 at Culzean Castle in Ayrshire, Scotland, which saw him reunite with Fry and Cox for a special rendition of "Addicted to Love", with Fry and Cox.

In February 2008, Hadley took part in the Italian Sanremo Festival, where he duetted in both English and Italian with contestant Paolo Meneguzzi on Meneguzzi's song, "Grande" ("Big"), during the third day of the contest, where all contestants re-interpreted their songs with guest artists. On 22 February 2008, he performed as an interval act at the semi-final of Dora 2008, the selection of the Croatian entry for the Eurovision Song Contest. By the summer of 2008, rumours of a Spandau Ballet reunion had reached the press and in the summer of 2009, a reunion tour with the original line-up was announced.

2011–2014: Spandau Ballet hiatus 
After two successful years touring, Spandau Ballet once again entered hiatus in June 2010. In 2011, Hadley stated that his solo career has been more financially rewarding than his period at the top of the charts with Spandau Ballet. He stated that 2008 was his best-ever earning year, having performed in over 220 shows. In 2012, Hadley recorded a career-spanning set of hits from Metropolis Studios, which was released in a limited edition CD/DVD box set the following year. In 2013, Hadley and 1980s chart peers Kim Wilde, Bananarama and Go West set a new world record for Comic Relief when they performed the highest ever gig, singing on a Boeing 767 aeroplane at 43,000 ft (13,000 m).

In 2014, Hadley took part in the prime-time RAI TV show La Pista as team leader of the Tacco 10 female dance troupe. Over the course of the competition, Hadley performed both Spandau Ballet's "Gold", as well as "Rio", originally a hit for rival band Duran Duran. The summer of 2014 saw the release of a new solo single, "Take Back Everything", before a further tour with Spandau Ballet to celebrate the band's 35th Anniversary was confirmed for the summer of 2015. Although recorded several years before, an unreleased album of Christmas songs was released on 27 November 2015, shortly after the conclusion of the tour.

2017–2021: Talking to the Moon 
On 3 July 2017, Hadley announced on Twitter that due to circumstances beyond his control, he was no longer a member of Spandau Ballet. Towards the end of 2017, Hadley duetted with Jane McDonald on the song "I See It in Your Eyes", from her album Hold the Covers Back, and went on to perform on her television Christmas special later that year. Talking to the Moon, Hadley's first album of original solo material since Passing Strangers, was released in the summer of 2018, backed by the single "Tonight Belongs to Us", and also including "Take Back Everything", despite it having been released four years earlier. A tour in support of the album followed in the autumn. Subsequently, work on a follow up album began in early 2020, with "Obvious", the first single recorded for the project, being released on 12 June.

Later in the year, Hadley was one of the featured vocalists on the single "The Best Christmas (in Lockdown)", a charity assemble of around one-hundred celebrities recording for the Hertfordshire-based Electric Umbrella organisation. In 2021, Hadley appeared alongside Marcella Detroit, Jools Holland and Glen Matlock on a charity version of the Robbie Williams song "Angels", recorded in tribute to the producer Steve Brown and with funds going to the late producer's COVID-19 charity.

2022–present: 40th Anniversary Tour 
On 18 February 2022, Hadley released his first solo single in over two years, "Because of You", an up-tempo number that marks a distinct change in his sound from previous solo material. During March and May 2022, Hadley will embark on a 40-date tour of the United Kingdom to celebrate his 40th Anniversary in the music business. The tour was scheduled for 2020, but was delayed due to the COVID-19 pandemic. The set includes a number of Spandau Ballet's big hits, a series of carefully selected covers, as well as several new tracks from Hadley's upcoming seventh solo album, including "Because of You", "Obvious" and the yet-to-be released "Mad About You". The tour will conclude with four special additional dates in October 2022, which will see Hadley backed by a full orchestra.

Other work and awards
Hadley worked as a radio presenter with Virgin Radio, taking over the Friday Night Virgin Party Classics show from Suggs (of the band Madness) in August 2007. In January 2008, he was given the Saturday Night Virgin Party Classics show as well. He left both shows in September 2008. In 2015 he was listed as a presenter for Absolute Radio and presented Tony Hadley's 80's Party on a Saturday night from 6.00 – 8.00pm on Absolute 80s until December 2019.

Hadley appeared, sang and gave advice in Pinoy Dream Academy, a singing reality show in the Philippines. He also appeared in RocKwiz, an Australian TV programme that aired in November 2008.

Hadley also appeared in the British short movie Shoot The DJ, in which he plays Eddie Richards. The film also featured Hadley's daughter, Toni. 

Hadley took part in the 2015 series of I'm a Celebrity...Get Me Out of Here!, beginning on 10 November 2015. He was eliminated on 4 December, finishing in sixth place.

In 2019, Hadley started presenting the Sunday Mid Morning Show on BBC Three Counties Radio. He also performed alongside Arisa in the fourth show of the Sanremo Music Festival 2019.

He is a patron of the UK Huntington's Disease Association, Shooting Star Chase and The Lowe Syndrome Trust.  In December 2019 it was announced that he had been awarded an MBE in the New Year Honours for charitable services to Shooting Star Chase Children's Hospice Care.

Personal life
Hadley has three children with his first wife, Leonie Lawson: Tom, Toni and Mackenzie. Hadley split from Lawson in 2003, after 20 years of marriage, and married Alison Evers in July 2009 at Cliveden House. They live in Buckinghamshire with their two children: Zara (born 21 December 2006) and Genevieve (born 6 February 2012).

Hadley is an Arsenal fan and has played for the Arsenal ex-Professional and Celebrity XI team. 

He is proud of his work ethic, which he states was instilled into him from a young age by his parents, and he says he has never claimed benefits.

In 2006, Hadley became a co-owner of the Red Rat Craft Brewery, which produced Hadley's Golden Ale and Hadley's Crazy Dog Stout. The business closed in 2013, after which Hadley became associated with The Great Yorkshire Brewery, which issued a lager called "Gold" and a pale ale called "Moonstone IPA".  This association has now ended.

Political affiliations
Hadley is a supporter of the Conservative Party and an admirer of former Prime Minister Margaret Thatcher. He has attended the party's annual conference and was reported in 2008 to be interested in standing as an MP. In 2012 the New Statesman described Hadley as one of the few openly right-wing rock stars.

Discography

Studio
 The State of Play  (1992)
 Tony Hadley (1997)
 True Ballads (2003)
 Passing Strangers (2006)
 The Christmas Album (2015)
 Talking to the Moon (2018)

Live
 Debut (2000; re-released 2003)
 Obsession: Live at Ronnie Scott's (2001; also re-released as Dance With Me and Tony Hadley: Reborn)
 Tony Hadley vs. Peter Cox & Go West (2004)
 Tony Hadley vs. Martin Fry & ABC (2005)
 Hadley, Norman & Keeble: An Evening of Gold (2009)
 Live from Metropolis Studios (2013)

EPs
 Get So Lonely (2001)

Singles

Literature

Hadley, Tony (2022). My Life in Pictures. London: Omnibus Press. ISBN 9781913172718.

References

External links

Tony Hadley's 80s Party on Absolute 80s

1960 births
British male jazz musicians
British synth-pop new wave musicians
Conservative Party (UK) people
English crooners
English jazz singers
English male film actors
English male singers
English new wave musicians
English pop singers
English soul singers
I'm a Celebrity...Get Me Out of Here! (British TV series) participants
Living people
Male new wave singers
Members of the Order of the British Empire
People from Islington (district)
People from Muswell Hill
Singers from London
Singing talent show winners
Sophisti-pop musicians
Spandau Ballet members
Virgin Radio (UK)
EMI Records artists
PolyGram artists
Universal Music Group artists